Luis Ezequiel "Chimy" Ávila (born 6 February 1994) is an Argentine professional footballer who plays as a forward for Spanish club Osasuna.

Club career

Tiro Federal
Born in Rosario, Santa Fe, Ávila played for Tiro Federal as a youth, also having a short spell at RCD Espanyol in 2010. He made his first team debut for the former on 18 October 2010 at the age of just 16, coming on as a second-half substitute for Gastón Meinicocci in a 0–2 Primera B Nacional away loss against Almirante Brown.

Ávila scored his first goal on 11 June 2011, netting his team's second in a 3–1 away win over Ferro Carril Oeste, as his side was already relegated. He did not establish himself as a regular starter for the side in the following seasons, as the club competed in the Torneo Argentino A.

In February 2013, Ávila was dismissed by the club after being accused of theft. He stayed nearly two years without playing football, working as a bricklayer. He was declared innocent only in 2018.

San Lorenzo
On 3 February 2015, Ávila signed a three-year contract with San Lorenzo. He made his club – and Primera División – debut on 19 April, replacing Matías Catalán in a 0–1 away loss against Aldosivi.

Ávila scored his first goal for Ciclón on 25 March 2017, netting his team's second in a 3–0 home win against Quilmes.

Huesca (loan)
On 1 August 2017, Ávila was loaned to Spanish Segunda División side SD Huesca for the season. He scored seven goals in 35 appearances as his side achieved promotion to La Liga, and had his loan extended for a further year on 16 June 2018.

Ávila made his debut in the Spanish top tier on 19 August 2018, replacing goalscorer Álex Gallar in a 2–1 away win against SD Eibar. Eight days later, he scored the equalizer in a 2–2 draw at Athletic Bilbao.

On 9 February 2019, Ávila scored a brace in a 2–0 away success over Girona FC. He scored ten times during the campaign, but could not prevent his side's relegation.

Osasuna
On 27 June 2019, CA Osasuna reached an agreement with San Lorenzo for the transfer of Ávila. He signed a four-year contract, for a fee of € 2.7 million. On his debut for the club on 17 August, he scored the game's only in an away success over CD Leganés.

In January 2020, Ávila suffered an injury on his left knee, being sidelined for the remainder of the season. In September, after being close to a return, he suffered the same injury on his right knee.

Ávila returned from injury in March 2021, and played his first match after 435 days sidelined on 3 April, a 0–0 home draw against Getafe CF.

Personal life
Ávila is the brother of the footballer Gastón Ávila. He grew up supporting his local club Rosario Central and he tattooed its crest onto his body. His nickname "Chimy" came from the word chimichurri, an Argentine sauce. He gained a Spanish passport in 2022.

Career statistics

Club

References

External links
 
 

1994 births
Living people
Footballers from Rosario, Santa Fe
Argentine footballers
Association football midfielders
Argentine Primera División players
Primera Nacional players
Torneo Argentino A players
Tiro Federal footballers
San Lorenzo de Almagro footballers
La Liga players
Segunda División players
SD Huesca footballers
CA Osasuna players
Argentine expatriate footballers
Argentine expatriate sportspeople in Spain
Expatriate footballers in Spain